Frederick Thomas Horne  (born August 25, 1961) is a Canadian retired politician and former Member of the Legislative Assembly of Alberta for the constituency of Edmonton-Rutherford as a Progressive Conservative.

Early life

Horne, a former debater, moved from Ontario to Alberta in 1992 to accept the position of executive director with the Alberta Debating and Speech Association. He later coached Team Canada at the World Schools Debating Championships. Prior to his election, he spent 25 years as a health policy consultant, working with various governments, health professional bodies, and research organizations to develop health care. Horne holds a master of business administration degree from Royal Roads University in Victoria, British Columbia and a postgraduate certification in dispute resolution from York University.

Political career

Horne was unsuccessful in his first bid to become an MLA. In the 2004 provincial election, he lost to Liberal leader Kevin Taft by almost 7,000 votes in the constituency of Edmonton-Riverview. After the election, he became executive assistant to then Health Minister Dave Hancock, a position in which he served until the next election.

In the 2008 provincial election, Horne recaptured the Edmonton-Rutherford constituency for the Progressive Conservatives after Liberal Rick Miller overcame Tory Ian McClelland in 2004. He defeated Miller by 62 votes to win, the second-closest race of all 83 provincial constituencies.

After his election to the Alberta Legislature, Horne chaired the Standing Committee on Health, which was tasked with examining Bill 24, the Adult Guardianship and Trusteeship Act. The proposed legislation concerns personal and financial substitute decision-making for mentally incapacitated adults.

On October 12, 2011, Horne was appointed the Minister of Health and Wellness. He was shuffled out of Cabinet on September 15, 2014.

Election results

References

1961 births
Living people
Members of the Executive Council of Alberta
People from Whitby, Ontario
Progressive Conservative Association of Alberta MLAs
21st-century Canadian politicians
Health ministers of Alberta